The Beiderbecke Tapes is a two-part British television drama serial written by Alan Plater and broadcast in 1987. It is the second serial in The Beiderbecke Trilogy and stars James Bolam and Barbara Flynn as schoolteachers Trevor Chaplin and Jill Swinburne. When a tape recording of a conversation about nuclear waste inadvertently falls into Trevor's hands, Trevor and Jill find themselves being pursued by national security agents.

Plot
Trevor Chaplin teaches woodwork and likes to listen to jazz. Jill Swinburne teaches English and wants to help save the planet. They live together and just want a quiet life. Then they meet John the barman who died but is much better now. John gives them a tape, which leads to meeting Dave the wimp. They find out about The People's Front for the Liberation of West Yorkshire. The man with no name called Mr Peterson came to see them. He was followed by the six men in grey suits. Jill goes to see The Oldest Suffragette in Town. Trevor and Jill go on a trip to Amsterdam with their class from "San Quentin High". Trevor and Jill meet The Honourable Order of Elks who are "looking for a bit of action".

The tone throughout is deliberately discursive and undramatic. Trevor and Jill are mistakenly given a secret tape recording, which results in their harassment by security forces, their home being invaded, their private lives used to discredit them at school and their being pursued all the way to Amsterdam and Edinburgh. Eventually the tapes are revealed as just a charade invented by shady government forces as a part of a disinformation campaign.

Characters
Trevor Chaplin – James Bolam
Jill Swinburne – Barbara Flynn
Mr Carter – Dudley Sutton
Mr Peterson – Malcolm Storry
Mr Wheeler – Keith Smith
Sylvia – Beryl Reid
Mr Pitt – Robert Longden
John the Barman – David Battley
Charlie the Gravedigger – Peter Martin
Tracy – John Alderson
Leo – Don Fellows
Harry – Peter Carlisle
Sam Bentley – Victor Maddern
Pronk – Bill Wallis
Yvonne Fairweather – Judy Brooke
Tour Guide – Marlous Fluitsma
Bella Atkinson – Maggie Jones
Dave the Wimp – Christopher Wilkinson
Man Opposite – Dave Leslie
Minister at Funeral – Geoff Oldham
Man at Funeral – Alan Starkey
Carstairs – Timothy Carlton
First Grey Guardian (uncredited) – Philip Wilde

Production

Structure
In the same style as the preceding The Beiderbecke Affair, the plot is less important than the banter and interplay between the characters. The adventure unfolds to a soundtrack of jazz music in the style of Bix Beiderbecke performed by Frank Ricotti with Kenny Baker as featured cornet soloist.

Filming locations
Jill's house – Norfolk Green, Chapel Allerton, Leeds
Trevor in the yellow van in traffic with impatient driver behind – Brudenell Grove, Leeds
Trevor and Jill in the yellow van travelling to the M62 – Meadow Lane, Leeds
San Quentin High – Foxwood School, Seacroft, Leeds
School staff room and school hall – Moor Grange County Secondary School, Ireland Wood, Leeds
Location where Jill and Trevor take Peterson to the canal. Is Skelton Grange Road over the Aire and Calder Navigation Canal, alongside the river Aire.
Supermarket car park – Safeway, Roundhay Road, Oakwood, Leeds.
Pub – The Haddon Hall, Burley, Leeds
Post office – Town Street, Horsforth, Leeds
Registrars office – Yeadon Yeadon Town hall
Peterson's office – Tower House, Merrion Street, Leeds
Cemetery scenes – Lawnswood Cemetery, Leeds
North Sea Ferries terminal, King George Dock – Kingston upon Hull
On board MV Norstar ferry
Bridge Leidsegracht, Leidsestraat, Amsterdam
Pronk's hotel – Estherea Hotel, Singel, Amsterdam
Oude Schans, Amsterdam
Jodenbree Straat, Amsterdam
Amstel, Amsterdam
Nieuwe Prinsengracht, Amsterdam
Reguliersgracht, Amsterdam
Herengracht, Amsterdam
Elks coach – Nassaukade, Amsterdam
Elks coach – A9 near Hoofddorp and Badhoevedorp
Elks coach – A4 motorway, Netherlands
Caledonian Hotel, Edinburgh
Princes Street Gardens, Edinburgh
Edinburgh Castle, Edinburgh
"A bit of action" – Victoria Terrace and Lady Stair's Close, Edinburgh

References

External links
 

1980s British comedy-drama television series
1987 British television series debuts
1987 British television series endings
English-language television shows
ITV comedy-dramas
Television series by ITV Studios
Television series by Yorkshire Television
Television shows set in Leeds
Television shows set in Yorkshire